Eslamabad-e Kahur Khoshk (also Romanized as Eslāmābād-e Kahūr Khoshk) is a village in Gonbaki Rural District, Gonbaki District, Rigan County, Kerman Province, Iran. At the 2006 census, its population was 182, in 41 families.

References 

Populated places in Rigan County